Quantuck Bay is off Long Island, Suffolk County New York bordering Quogue and the Quogue Wildlife Refuge.

References

Bays of Suffolk County, New York
Bays of New York (state)
Southampton (town), New York